Chris Lynch (born July 2, 1962) is an American writer of books for young people. His works include Inexcusable, a finalist for the U.S. National Book Award for Young People's Literature, and  Iceman,"The Right Fight", Shadow Boxer, Gold Dust, and Slot Machine,   all ALA Best Books for Young Adults; Freewill was also a runner-up for the Michael L. Printz Award.  Some of his works are intended for a high school level audience; some for children and  younger teenagers.

His short story "The Pellet in the paint can"  has been included in the collection Guys Write for Guys Read. (New York: Viking, 2005), and  "Arrangements" was included in No Such Thing as the Real World (HarperCollins, 2009 ).

Lynch was born in Boston where he graduated from Emerson College and teaches Creative Writing at Lesley University as of 2011.

Books

Standalone works
Pieces (Simon & Schuster Books for Young Readers, 2013)
The Big Game of Everything (Harper Teen, 2008)
Me, dead Dad and Alcatraz (HarperCollins, 2005)
Reviewed in School Library Journal and Booklist
Sins of the Fathers (Harper Tempest, 2006)
Inexcusable (Atheneum Books for Young Readers,  2005)
Korean translation: 용서할수없는 / Yongsŏ halsu ŏmnŭn (메타포, Sŏul-si : Metʻapʻo, 2008.)
The gravedigger's cottage 2005
Who the man  2002
All the old haunts 2001
Freewill  (Harper Teen, 2001) 
Reviews: Horn Book, Chicago Tribune, Kirkus Reviews
German translation: Nenn es wie du willst (Hamburg : Carlsen, 2003)
Gold dust 2000 
Extreme Elvin 1999
Whitechurch 1999
Mick   and Dog eat dog  1996
Blood relations 1996
Political timber 1996
Slot Machine 1995
Iceman 1994
Gypsy Davey 1994
Italian translation: Davey il vagabond (Milano : Mondadori, 2001)
Shadow Boxer 1993

He-Man Women Hater's Club series
 The Wolf Gang (1998)
 Johnny Chesthair  (1997)
 Ladies Choice (1997)
 Scratch and the Sniffs (1997)
 Babes in the Wood 
 Little Rascals (1994)

Cyberia series 

 Cyberia  (Scholastic Press, 2008) 
 Monkey See, Monkey Don't (Scholastic Press, 2009 )

Vietnam series
 Vietnam: I Pledge Allegiance (2011)
 Vietnam: Sharpshooter (2012)
 Vietnam: Free-Fire Zone (2012)
 Vietnam: Casualties Of War (2013)
 Vietnam: Walking Wounded (2014)

World War II series
 World War II: The Right Fight (2013)
 World War II: Dead In the Water (2013)
 World War II: Alive And Kicking (2014)
 World War II: The Liberators (2015)

References

External links

 
 

1962 births
American children's writers
American science fiction writers
Writing teachers
Emerson College alumni
Living people
American male novelists